The 1952 Michigan Wolverines football team represented the University of Michigan in the 1952 Big Ten Conference football season. In its fifth year under head coach Bennie Oosterbaan, Michigan compiled a 5–4 record (4–2 against conference opponents), tied for fourth place in the Big Ten, and outscored opponents by a combined total of 207 to 134.

Defensive end Merritt Green was the team captain, and quarterback Tony Branoff received the team's most valuable player award.

Lowell Perry was selected by the Newspaper Enterprise Association (NEA) as a first-team defensive back on the 1952 College Football All-America Team. Five Michigan players received All-Big Ten honors: linebacker Roger Zatkoff (AP-1, UP-1); guard Bob Timm (AP-1); center Dick O'Shaugnessy (UP-1); left halfback Ted Kress (UP-1); and defensive tackle Art Walker (AP-1).

The team's statistical leaders included Ted Kress with 559 passing yards and 623 rushing yards and Lowell Perry with 492 receiving yards.

Schedule

Game summaries

Northwestern
 Ted Kress 20 Rush, 218 Yds

Statistical leaders
Michigan's individual statistical leaders for the 1952 season include those listed below.

Rushing

Passing

Receiving

Kickoff returns

Punt returns

Personnel

Letter winners

The following players received varsity letters for their participation on the 1953 team. Players who started at least four games are shown with their names in bold.

Fred Baer, 5'11", 180 pounds, sophomore, La Grange, IL – started 3 games at fullback
James Balog, 6'3", 210 pounds, junior, Wheaton, IL – started 8 games as defensive right tackle
Richard Balzhiser 6'1", 185 pounds, junior, Wheaton, IL – started 5 games at fullback
 James V. Bates, 6'0", 195 pounds, sophomore, Farmington, MI - end
Richard Beison, 6'0", 200 pounds, junior, East Chicago, IN – started 8 games at offensive right guard
Donald Bennett, 6'2", 195 pounds, junior, Chicago, IL – started 4 games as offensive left tackle
 William E. Billings, 5'11", 180 pounds, senior, Flint, MI - quarterback
Tony Branoff, 5'1", 180 pounds, freshman, Flint, MI – started 6 games as right halfback
 Ted Cachey, 5'11", 185 pounds, junior, Chicago, IL - guard
 J. Daniel Cline, 5'10", 168 pounds, sophomore, Brockport, NY - halfback
 Robert Dingman, 6'0", 180 pounds, senior, Saginaw, MI - end
 Donald Dugger, 5'10", 178 pounds, junior, Charlesto, WV - guard
George Dutter, 6'2", 190 pounds, junior, Fort Wayne, IN – started 9 games as defensive right guard
 H. Ronald Geyer, 6'2", 215 pounds, sophomore, Toledo, OH - tackle
Merritt Green, 6'0", 180 pounds, senior, Toledo, OH – started 9 games as defensive left end
Frank Howell, 5'8", 165 pounds, senior, Muskegon Heights, MI – started 3 games as right halfback, 1 game as safety
 Robert Hurley, 5'10", 185 pounds, junior, Alaamosa, CO - fullback
 Stanley Knickerbocker, 5'10", 165 pounds, sophomore, Chelsea, MI - halfback
Gene Knutson, 6'4", 210 pounds, junior, Beloit, WI – started 9 games as defensive right end
Ted Kress, 5'11", 175 pounds, junior, Detroit – started 9 games as left halfback
Laurence LeClair, 6'0", 190 pounds, senior, Anaconda, MT – started 9 games as linebacker
 Robert K. Matheson, 5'10", 190 pounds, senior, Detroit - guard
 Duncan McDonald, 6'0", 175 pounds, sophomore, Flint, MI - quarterback
 Wayne F. Melchiori, 6'0", 185 pounds, senior, Stambaugh, MI - center
Don Oldham, 5'9", 167 pounds, senior, Indianapolis – started 4 games as defensive back, 2 games as safety
Dick O'Shaughnessy, 5'11", 190 pounds, junior, Seaford, NY – started 9 games at center
Bernhardt Pederson, 6'2", 215 pounds, senior, Marquette, MI -started 6 games at offensive right tackle
Lowell Perry, 6'0", 180 pounds, senior, Ypsilanti, MI – started 9 games as offensive left end, 4 games as safety
Russell Rescorla, 5'11", 180 pounds, senior, Grand Haven, MI – started 3 games as defensive back
Thad Stanford, 6'0", 190 pounds, junior, Midland, MI – started 9 games at offensive right end
 Ralph Stribe, 6'1", 205 pounds, senior, Detroit - tackle
Dick Strozewski, 6'0", 200 pounds, senior, South Bend, IN – started 5 games as offensive left tackle
Bob Timm, 5'11", 185 pounds, senior, Toledo, OH – started 8 games as offensive left guard 
David Tinkham, 5'10", 178 pounds, senior, East Grand Rapids, MI – started 9 games as defensive back
Ted Topor, 6'1", 212 pounds, senior, East Chicago, IN – started 9 games as quarterback
 Bob Topp, 6'2", 190 pounds, junior, Kalamazoo, MI - end
Art Walker, 5'11", 198 pounds, sophomore, South Haven, MI – started 9 games as defensive left tackle
Ronald Williams, 5'9", 185 pounds, junior, Massillon, OH – started 7 games as defensive left guard
 Thomas Witherspoon, 5'11", 185 pounds, senior, Detroit - halfback
Roger Zatkoff, 6'2", 210 pounds, senior, Hamtramck, MI – started 9 games as linebacker, 1 game as offensive right tackle

Coaching staff
Head coach: Bennie Oosterbaan
Assistant coaches:
 Jack Blott - line coach
 George Ceithaml - backfield coach
 Cliff Keen - head wrestling coach and assistant football coach
 Bill Orwig - end coach
 Don Robinson - junior varsity coach
 Wally Weber - freshman coach and scout
 J. T. White - assistant line coach
Trainer: Jim Hunt
Manager: Gerry Dudley

Awards and honors
Honors and awards for the 1952 season went to the following individuals.
 Captain: Merritt Green
 All-Americans: Lowell Perry
 All-Conference: Roger Zatkoff, Art Walker, Bob Timm, Dick O'Shaughnessy, Ted Kress
 Most Valuable Player: Ted Topor
 Meyer Morton Award: Gene Knutson

References

Michigan
Michigan Wolverines football seasons
Michigan Wolverines football